The 1949 Purdue Boilermakers football team was an American football team that represented Purdue University during the 1949 Big Nine Conference football season.  In their third season under head coach Stu Holcomb, the Boilermakers compiled a 4–5 record, finished in eighth place in the Big Ten Conference with a 2–4 record against conference opponents, and were outscored by their opponents by a total of 175 to 126.

Notable players from the 1949 Purdue team included tackle Lou Karras and fullback John Kerestes.

Schedule

Game summaries

Iowa
 John Kerestes 24 rushes, 150 yards

Marquette
 Harry Szulborski 15 rushes, 162 yards
 Norbert Adams 8 rushes, 113 yards

Indiana
 Harry Szulborski 20 rushes, 110 yards

References

Purdue
Purdue Boilermakers football seasons
Purdue Boilermakers football